The Moldavan (Moldova) Women's Volleyball Championship is an annual competition of women's volleyball teams in Moldova. It has been held since 1993 (irregularly in the 1990s) just after the dissolution of the Soviet Union State. 
Since the 2014/15 season it is held under the "fall-spring" system.

Competition Formula 
The 2021/2022 Championship consisted of two phases - preliminary and playoffs. In the preliminary stage the teams played in two rounds. According to the results, the 4 best teams qualify for the playoffs and then a knock-out system determined the two finalists, who will play for the championship. 
The series of playoff matches were played until two (semi-finals) or until three for the (finals). 
Eight teams took part in the championship 2021/22: "Dinamo-MAI" (Chisinau), "Dinamo-Gloria" (Tiraspol), "UTM-Politeh" (Chisinau), "Gamma-Sind" (Cahul), "Speranza" (Chisinau), SDYUSHOR-12 (Vadul-lui-Voda), "Tighina-SSH #2" (Bender), HMSC (Chisinau). The champion's title was won by "Dinamo-MAI" which beat "Dinamo-Gloria" 3-0 (3:1, 3:2, 3:1) in the final series.

Past Champions

References

External links
 Страница ФВРМ на facebook

 

Moldovan League
1993 establishments in Moldova
Volleyball in Moldova 
Moldovan League